The Campania regional election of 1970 took place on 7–8 June 1970.

Events
Christian Democracy was by far the largest party, gaining almost twice the share of vote of the Italian Communist Party, which came second. After the election, Christian Democrat Carlo Leone was elected President of the Region, but as soon as in 1971 he was replaced by fellow Christian Democrat Nicola Mancino. In 1972 Mancino was replaced by Alberto Servidio, to whom Vittorio Cascetta succeeded in 1973.

Results

Source: Ministry of the Interior

1970 elections in Italy
1970 regional election
1970
June 1970 events in Europe